Rafaela Lopes Silva (born 24 April 1992) is a Brazilian judoka. She won gold medals at the World Judo Championships of 2013 and 2022 and at the 2016 Summer Olympics in the –57 kg weight division. Currently, she occupies the graduation third sergeant in the Navy of Brazil and integrates the Center of Physical Education Admiral Nunes (CEFAN), the Military Sports Department.

In August 2013, she was the first Brazilian woman to become a world champion in Judo.

Biography
Rafaela Silva grew up in the Rio de Janeiro slum known as Cidade de Deus. The first sport she  liked was football, practicing against other children in a dirt field near her home in Jacarepagua. Because they were concerned with fights and violence in the streets, when Rafaela was 7 years old her parents Luiz Carlos and Zenilda Silva signed her up, together with her sister, Raquel, for judo classes at the Institute Reaction, newly fitted at Cidade de Deus the former athlete Flávio Canto.

"I started judo in 2000, early in the project. My father put me in the sport as an alternative to fighting in the street. In Judo, I found discipline, I respect the other and began to take the sport seriously. Judo showed me the world. With the resources I get, I guarantee my support and help my family pay the bills. "

Judo career

Silva won her first major medal by claiming silver at the 2011 World Judo Championships in Paris. During the 2013 World Judo Championships in Rio de Janeiro, Silva became the first Brazilian woman to ever win a gold medal  for her country in a World Judo Championship after defeating American Marti Malloy in the final. She repeated the feat at the 2016 Summer Olympics by defeating Mongolian Sumiya Dorjsuren in the final.

In the 2012 Summer Olympics in London, Rafaela was disqualified by the judges in the second round by an illegal coup. The most dramatic moment of Rafaela in the sport. When it ended up being a victim of racism in social networks. Upon returning home, she became depressed. She spent a lot of time lying down, not wanting to leave. "A lot of people came to say that she needed to turn around," her mother said. In December 2012, she was a bronze medalist at the Grand Slam of Tokyo (category up to 63 kg).

Silva won gold and bronze in 2019 Pan American Games and 2019 Judo World Championships, respectively, but tested positive for fenoterol after the former tournament. Despite testing negative in the World Championships, she was banned from competition for two years by IJF and stripped of both medals. Silva appealed the sanction, but the CAS upheld the ban in late 2020.

Mixed martial arts career
Being temporarily banned from judo, Silva opted to transition to mixed martial arts. She is currently training at PFL athlete Joilton Santos' gym Peregrino Fight Academy with UFC athlete Cláudio Silva and is expected to compete in the Flyweight division.

Personal life
In an interview to Globo Sports, Rafaela came out and identified as gay. She spoke about her relationship with student Thamara Cezar, whom she knew in Institute Reaction.

References

External links

 
 
 
 
 

Living people
Judoka at the 2011 Pan American Games
Judoka at the 2015 Pan American Games
Judoka at the 2012 Summer Olympics
Judoka at the 2016 Summer Olympics
Olympic judoka of Brazil
1992 births
Brazilian female judoka
Pan American Games silver medalists for Brazil
Pan American Games bronze medalists for Brazil
Olympic gold medalists for Brazil
Medalists at the 2016 Summer Olympics
Olympic medalists in judo
Pan American Games medalists in judo
Afro-Brazilian people
Sportspeople from Rio de Janeiro (city)
Brazilian LGBT sportspeople
Lesbian sportswomen
LGBT judoka
Brazilian sportspeople in doping cases
Doping cases in judo
Medalists at the 2011 Pan American Games
Medalists at the 2015 Pan American Games